The flag of the state of Montana consists of the image of the Montana state seal centered on a blue field.

History
Within the seal, a plow, shovel, and pick rest in a field in front of the Great Falls of the Missouri River. The ribbon contains the state motto, Oro y plata, which is Spanish for "Gold and silver". The current flag was adopted in 1905, and the word "Montana" above the seal was added in 1981. In 1985, the flag was again modified to specify the font used in "Montana:" Helvetica Bold. Before it was adopted as a state flag, it was used by Montana troops deploying for the Spanish–American War.

The North American Vexillological Association (NAVA) declared the flag of Montana to be the third worst state/provincial flag, 70th in a field of 72 in a list that contained all the provinces of Canada, U.S. states and U.S. territories. Georgia's flag was named the worst, but has since been changed, and Nebraska's flag was named second worst. NAVA stated that about half of U.S. states used blue fields making them difficult to distinguish and the survey ranked flags with words and complex seals the lowest.

See also 
 State of Montana
 Symbols of the state of Montana
 Great Seal of the State of Montana

References

External links

 Symbols of Montana

Montana culture
Montana
Flags of Montana
Montana